Garda GAA was a Gaelic Athletic Association club based in the city and county of Cork in Ireland. The club was founded in 1949 and was composed of members of the Garda Síochána.

Honours

Cork Senior Football Championships: 1
 1950

Notable players

 Con McGrath
 Paddy O'Driscoll
 Jas Murphy

References

Gaelic games clubs in County Cork
Gaelic football clubs in County Cork